Gare de Pont-l'Évêque is a railway station serving the town Pont-l'Évêque, arrondissement of Lisieux, Calvados department, Normandy, France.

Services
The station is served by regional and local trains to Trouville-Deauville, Lisieux and Paris.

References

Railway stations in Calvados